"Accarezzame" (Neapolitan for "caress me") is a song composed by  Nisa and Pino Calvi.
 
The song, a portrait of a romantic approach in a wheat field, went to be a classic of the Canzone Napoletana, and it was later covered by numerous artists, including Nilla Pizzi, Ornella Vanoni, Gigliola Cinquetti, Roberto Murolo, Peppino di Capri, Fausto Cigliano, Fred Bongusto, Perez Prado, Natalino Otto, Peter Van Wood, Iva Zanicchi, Massimo Ranieri, Fausto Papetti, Achille Togliani.

Track listing

 7" single – RE 17 
 "Accarezzame"  (Nisa, Pino Calvi)
 " 'Na voce 'na chitarra e o poco 'e luna" (Carlo Alberto Rossi, Ugo Calise)

References

 

1955 singles
Neapolitan songs
1954 songs